N-acetylneuraminate epimerase (sialic acid epimerase, N-acetylneuraminate mutarotase, sialic acid mutarotase, YjhT, NanM) is an enzyme with systematic name N-acetyl-alpha-neuraminate 2-epimerase. This enzyme catalyses the following chemical reaction

 N-acetyl-alpha-neuraminate  N-acetyl-beta-neuraminate

Sialoglycoconjugates present in vertebrates are linked exclusively by alpha-linkages.

See also
 sialic acid
 N-acetylneuraminate
 Mutarotation

References

External links 
 

EC 5.1.3